Marisa Ferretti Barth  (April 28, 1931 – March 28, 2021) was a Canadian Senator.

Life and career
Born in Ascoli Piceno, Italy, Marisa Ferretti Barth was a social worker, human resources consultant and community organizer before her appointment to the Senate. She established 84 seniors' clubs for Italian-Canadians as well as helping found a seniors' club for Chinese Canadians in Montreal as well as seniors organizations for other ethnic groups. She founded the Regional Council of Italian-Canadian Seniors serving as its executive director since 1975 and also was a board member of the National Congress of Italian Canadians in the 1980s. 
 
She was appointed to the Senate on September 22, 1997 on the advice of Prime Minister Jean Chrétien and represented the province of Quebec. She sat as a Liberal, until her mandatory retirement at the age of 75 on April 28, 2006.

Honours
In 2008, she was made an Officer of the National Order of Quebec. In 2003, she was made a Grand Officer of the Order of Merit of the Italian Republic.

References

1931 births
2021 deaths
Canadian senators from Quebec
Liberal Party of Canada senators
Officers of the National Order of Quebec
Grand Officers of the Order of Merit of the Italian Republic
Italian emigrants to Canada
People of Marchesan descent
Women members of the Senate of Canada
Women in Quebec politics
People from Ascoli Piceno
21st-century Canadian politicians
21st-century Canadian women politicians